Forbes Spain is a monthly business magazine which was started in 2013. It is the 25th international edition of American business magazine Forbes. The publisher is SPAINMEDIA, and the founding editor of the magazine was Andrés Rodríguez, chair of the SPAINMEDIA. Forbes Spain is headquartered in Madrid.

References

External links
 

2013 establishments in Spain
Business magazines published in Spain
Magazines established in 2013
Magazines published in Madrid
Monthly magazines published in Spain
Spanish-language magazines